William Addams Reitwiesner (March 8, 1954 – November 12, 2010) was an American genealogist who traced the ancestry of United States political figures, European royalty and celebrities.

Biography
Reitwiesner was born on 8 March 1954 in Havre de Grace, Maryland, the son of Homé Stephens (McAllister) and George Walter Reitwiesner. He grew up in Aberdeen, Maryland and Silver Spring. His grandfather, Addams Stratton McAllister, was a board member of the National Genealogical Society, and from the age of five, Reitwiesner would explore his grandfather's library.

After graduating from Montgomery Blair High School in 1972, Reitwiesner joined the Library of Congress's Congressional Research Service (CRS) as a cart pusher. He spent the rest of his working life in menial jobs at the Library of Congress so that he could devote his time pursuing his interest in genealogy. Although much of his work was self-published on the internet, he acquired a reputation for meticulousness and accuracy and many genealogists cited him in their publications.

He died of cancer in Washington, D.C. on November 12, 2010.

Works and publications 
Genealogies that Reitwiesner published include:

Print

Online 
Although Reitwiesner's original website is now in abeyance (www.wargs.com), much of his research that was published online can still be accessed using archive websites. This research includes:
 Ancestries of Barack Obama, Joe Biden, George W. Bush, Dick Cheney, Bill Clinton, Al Gore and other U.S. political figures.
 Descendants of Bonnie Prince Charlie.
 The Ancestry of Camilla Parker Bowles, now the Queen Consort of the United Kingdom.
 The Ancestry of Mary Donaldson, now The Crown Princess of Denmark.
 The Ancestry of Queen Silvia of Sweden.
 Ancestries of David Cameron, Nicolas Sarkozy and other prominent European figures.

He prefaced his genealogy of Barack Obama with the text  Most of his Internet publications carry similar disclaimers.

Publications where his assistance or publications have been acknowledged include:
 Williamson's work on the ancestry of Diana, Princess of Wales

References

External links
Genealogy of William Addams Reitwiesner

American genealogists
1954 births
2010 deaths
People from Havre de Grace, Maryland
People from Aberdeen, Maryland
People from Silver Spring, Maryland
Deaths from cancer in Washington, D.C.
Historians from Maryland